Kaolin is a rock rich with kaolinite.

Kaolin may also refer to:

Places 
 Kaolin, Pennsylvania
 Kaolin Creek

See also 
 Kaolin and morphine, medicinal clay
 Kaolin clotting time, a sensitive test to detect lupus anticoagulants
 Kaolin spray, pest control that has kaolin as the main ingredient